The Rasina District is one of eight administrative districts of Šumadija and Western Serbia. It expands to the central parts of Serbia. According to the 2011 census results, it has a population of 241,999 inhabitants. The administrative center of the Rasina District is Kruševac.

Municipalities
The district encompasses the municipalities of:
 Varvarin
 Trstenik
 Ćićevac
 Kruševac
 Aleksandrovac
 Brus

Demographics

According to the last official census done in 2011, the Rasina District has 241,999 inhabitants. 53.8% of the population lives in the urban areas. Ethnic composition of the district:

Culture and history
Kruševac and its vicinity are distinguished by numerous historic monuments: The Lazar's Town, with the remnants of the medieval fortification and the Lazarica Church has an epic quality in the Serbian tradition. The Lazarica Church, built in 1376 on the occasion of Stephan's son birth, and dedicated to St. Stephen, is the model of the Moravska School.

A Donjon Tower, the military fortification of the medieval castle, bears witness of the great cultural and historic heritage of the Serb people. The Monastery of Ljubostinja was founded by Princess Milica, Lazar's wife, in the late fourteenth and early fifteenth century, after the Battle of Kosovo, when she made a decision on her withdrawal as a ruler, and on assembling the widows of the Serbian gentry killed at the Kosovo. From its first days the Ljubostinja played an important part in culture. Distinguished chroniclers, engrossers, book design masters, and painters were asked to come here.

See also 
 Administrative divisions of Serbia
 Districts of Serbia

References 

Note: All official material made by Government of Serbia is public by law.

External links 

 

 
Districts of Šumadija and Western Serbia
Wine regions of Serbia